Say Nothing: A True Story of Murder and Memory in Northern Ireland is a 2018 book by writer and journalist Patrick Radden Keefe. It focuses on the Troubles in Northern Ireland. It spent six weeks on The New York Times Best Seller list and received widespread critical acclaim.

Summary
Say Nothing focuses on The Troubles in Northern Ireland, beginning with the 1972 abduction and murder of Jean McConville. Keefe began researching and writing the book after reading the obituary for Dolours Price in 2013.

Title
The book's title is taken from the poem "Whatever You Say, Say Nothing" by Irish Nobel laureate Seamus Heaney from his collection North (1975).

Publication
Say Nothing was first published by the William Collins imprint of HarperCollins on November 1, 2018. It was later published in the US by Doubleday on February 26, 2019.

The book debuted at number seven on The New York Times Hardcover Nonfiction best-sellers list on March 17, 2019. It spent six weeks on the list. Say Nothing also debuted at number five on The New York Times Combined Print & E-Book Nonfiction best-sellers list on March 17, 2019. It spent six weeks on the list.

Reception
On the review aggregator website Book Marks, which assigns individual ratings to book reviews from mainstream literary critics, the book received a cumulative "Rave" rating based on 21 reviews: 11 "Rave" reviews and 10 "Positive" reviews. Jennifer Szalai of The New York Times wrote, "Keefe's narrative is an architectural feat, expertly constructed out of complex and contentious material, arranged and balanced just so."

Maureen Corrigan of NPR enthusiastically wrote, "Keefe is a storyteller who captures the complexities of a historical moment by digging deep into the lives of people on all sides of the conflict." Corrigan concludes, "At the end of his panoramic book, which gathers together history, politics and biography, Keefe tightens the focus back to the mystery of McConville's abduction and murder. And, as in the most ingenious crime stories, Keefe unveils a revelation — lying, so to speak, in plain sight — that only further complicates the moral dimensions of his tale."

Devlin Barrett of The Washington Post described how Say Nothing is "a cautionary tale, [that] speaks volumes — about the zealotry of youth, the long-term consequences of violence and the politics of forgetting."

The Economist noted, "The discerning skill with which Mr. Radden Keefe gets inside these characters' minds may unsettle some readers, but it is also his book's strength. He shows how people who in peacetime might just have been strong-willed or colourful types came to condone or perpetrate the unspeakable."

Stephen Phillips of The Los Angeles Times praised the book saying, "'Say Nothing' powerfully documents a society benumbed by trauma attempting to reckon with the abyss that engulfed it."

The book was named one of the top ten books of 2019 by both the New York Times Book Review and the Washington Post. It won the 2019 National Book Critics Circle Award for nonfiction.

References

2018 non-fiction books
William Collins, Sons books
Books about the Troubles (Northern Ireland)
English-language books
National Book Critics Circle Award-winning works
Doubleday (publisher) books